Pangasius conchophilus is a species of shark catfish. It is found in the Mekong, Bangpakong, and Chao Phraya basins.

Description
This species counts with 25 to 30 anal soft rays. Its dorsum is a dull grey colour with a pale green iridescence. Its maxillary band of teeth forms a continuous row, and its snout protrudes with upper jaw tooth bands which are somewhat exposed when the animal's mouth is closed; it possesses a large median vomerine tooth plate.

The fish habitates large rivers and enters flooded forests. It is also found in rapids and in deep slow reaches. Juveniles are found to feed on prawns and insects, while adults on prawns, insects, mollusks, and on plants. The species migrates into the middle Mekong along the Thai-Lao border as water turbidity increases. It is a local edible specimen.

References

Further reading
Hung, L. T., et al. "Comparing growth and protein requirements for fingerlings of three catfish of the Mekong River (Pangasius Bocourti, Pangagasius Hypothalmus and Pangasius Conchophilus)." Journal of Aquaculture in the Tropics 17.4 (2002): 325–335.
Poulsen, Anders F., and John Valbo-Jorgensen. "Deep pools in the Mekong River." Catch and Culture 7.1 (2001): 1–8.
Ngamsiri, T., et al. "Characterization of microsatellite DNA markers in a critically endangered species, Mekong giant catfish, Pangasianodon gigas."Molecular Ecology Notes 6.2 (2006): 313–315.

External links

Pangasiidae
Catfish of Asia
Taxa named by Tyson R. Roberts
Taxa named by Chavalit Vidthayanon
Fish described in 1991